The Messapio (also known as Ktypas (Κτυπάς)) is a small mountain range located in the northeastern part of Boeotia and the mainland part of Euboea regional unit in central Greece. It borders on the North Euboean Gulf and the Euripus Strait to the north and east. Its highest point is 1,021 m. It is 20 km long and 10 to 15 km wide and covers an area of 300 km². It separates the area around Chalcis from the Boeotian plains around Thebes. In the south, on the slope of the 740 m high mountain Ypato, there is the monastery of the Transfiguration of the Saviour. The nearest mountain ranges are the Ptoo to the northwest. The Motorway 1 (Athens - Larissa - Thessaloniki) passes south of the mountain.

Settlements

 North: Loukisia, Anthidona
 East: Chalcis, Vathy and Ritsona
 South: Ypato
 West: Mouriki

History

The Messapion was mentioned by Pausanias in his Description of Greece. Most of the mountain used to be covered with dense pine forests, and it was rich in animals such as foxes, jackals and wolves. But fires and deforestation have largely destroyed the forests since the 1940s.

References

Landforms of Euboea (regional unit)
Landforms of Boeotia
Mountain ranges of Greece
Landforms of Central Greece